1 of 1 is the first studio album by Panamanian singer Sech, released on May 21, 2020 through Rich Music. It was mainly produced by Dimelo Flow (who also produced Sech's previous album) with contributions from producers Slow Mike, Jhon El Diver, Subelo NEO, Sky Rompiendo, Symon Dice, Dynell, Rike Music, Alez El Ecuatoriano, Mozart Musik and Klasico and features collaborations with Myke Towers, Arcángel, Gigolo & La Exce, Daddy Yankee, Lenny Tavárez, Nando Boom, Justin Quiles, Farruko, BCA and Ozuna.

At the 21st Annual Latin Grammy Awards, the album was nominated for Best Urban Music Album while the song "Si Te Vas" received a nomination for Best Reggaeton Performance. It also received a nomination for Urban Album of the Year at the Premio Lo Nuestro 2021.

The album peaked at number 168 and 4 at the Billboard 200 and Top Latin Albums charts, respectively, it also peaked at number 21 on the Independent Albums chart.

Background
Prior to the release of the album, Sech released an EP titled A Side on April 16, 2020, the EP was composed of four songs, "Goteras", "Panama City", "Fé" and "Trofeo", all four songs were eventually included into 1 of 1. The date for the release of the album alongside its number of tracks and collaborations was announced by Sech himself during a zoom listening party from Panama City, where he lived during the COVID-19 pandemic.

The album was released on May 21, 2020, composing of 21 tracks and featuring collaborations with urban music artists such as Daddy Yankee and Ozuna, among others, about the release and reception of the album, Sech said that "the uncertainty was huge, I was very nervous but the result is being much better that I have imagined, I am very happy". The name of the album comes from the fact that each song is separated from the others, only connected by Sech's voice and the themes of love and heartbreak.

Singles
The album's first single was the song "Si Te Vas" with Puerto Rican singer Ozuna, released on September 26, 2019. The second single "Relación" was released on April 1, 2020, with a remix of the song featuring Daddy Yankee, J Balvin, Rosalía and Farruko being released on September 4, 2020. The remix of the song peaked at number 2 and 64 at the Hot Latin Songs and Billboard Hot 100 charts, respectively, being Sech's fourth entry into the latter chart.

Track listing

Charts

Certifications

References

2020 albums